Groman is a surname. Notable people with the surname include:

Bill Groman (1936–2020), American football player
Herman Groman (1882–1954), American athlete
Vladimir Groman (1874–1940), Russian economist

See also
Gorman (surname)
Grogan
Roman (surname)